Woods III: The Deepest Roots and Darkest Blues is the second full-length album and third studio release by Woods of Ypres. It was recorded in 2007 in Toronto, Ontario, and it was the band's last album released before relocating to Sault Ste. Marie, Ontario in 2008. Woods III marked the band's only album to feature bassist/producer Dan Hulse, their last with keyboardist Jessica Rose, and their last album with frontman David Gold on studio drums until Woods 5: Grey Skies & Electric Light in 2012.

Four songs from Woods III were later re-issued in the band's 2009 compilation CD Independent Nature 2002-2007. Though not the last release on the label, this album was Woods of Ypres' last full studio release on Krankenhaus Records before it was succeeded by Gold's new independent label Practical Art Records in 2009.

Similarly to their previous album, and despite its length, material from Woods III was not commonly heard at the band's post-2007 concerts. Only "Your Ontario Town is a Burial Ground" survived into the band's post-2009 setlists (possibly due to Woods of Ypres' shift to a more doom-oriented sound), though "The Northern Cold", "Distractions of Living Alone", and "Thrill of the Struggle" were also played live following the album's release.

A music video for "The Northern Cold" was released in 2007 featuring the performers on Woods III, along with then-members Shawn Stoneman on guitar & Chris Mezzabotta on drums, neither of which performed on any Woods of Ypres albums.

Track listing

Personnel
David Gold – vocals, drums, guitar
Jessica Rose  – keyboards
Dan Hulse  – bass guitar, vocals

References

2007 albums
Woods of Ypres albums